The 130 nanometer (130 nm) process is a level of semiconductor process technology that was reached in the 2000–2001 timeframe, by most leading semiconductor companies, like Intel, Texas Instruments, IBM, and TSMC.

The origin of the 130 nm value is historical, as it reflects a trend of 70% scaling every 2–3 years. The naming is formally determined by the International Technology Roadmap for Semiconductors (ITRS).

Some of the first CPUs manufactured with this process include Intel Tualatin family of Pentium III processors.

Processors using 130 nm manufacturing technology
 Motorola PowerPC 7447 and 7457 2002
 IBM Gekko (Nintendo GameCube)
 IBM PowerPC G5 970 - October 2002 - June 2003
 Intel Pentium III Tualatin - 2001-06
 Intel Celeron Tualatin-256 - 2001-10-02
 Intel Pentium M Banias - 2003-03-12
 Intel Pentium 4 Northwood - 2002-01-07
 Intel Celeron Northwood-128 - 2002-09-18
 Intel Xeon Prestonia and Gallatin - 2002-02-25
 VIA C3 - 2001
 AMD Athlon XP Thoroughbred, Thorton, and Barton
 AMD Athlon MP Thoroughbred - 2002-08-27
 AMD Athlon XP-M Thoroughbred, Barton, and Dublin
 AMD Duron Applebred - 2003-08-21
 AMD K7 Sempron Thoroughbred-B, Thorton, and Barton - 2004-07-28
 AMD K8 Sempron Paris - 2004-07-28
 AMD Athlon 64 Clawhammer and Newcastle - 2003-09-23
 AMD Opteron Sledgehammer - 2003-06-30
 Elbrus 2000 1891ВМ4Я (1891VM4YA) - 2008-04-27 
 MCST-R500S 1891BM3 - 2008-07-27 
 Vortex 86SX -

References

00130